The equestrian competition at the 2018 Central American and Caribbean Games was held in Barranquilla, Colombia from 20 to 29 July at the Escuela de Equitación del Ejercito.

Medal summary

Dressage

Eventing

Jumping

Medal table

References

External links
2018 Central American and Caribbean Games – Equestrian

2018 Central American and Caribbean Games events
Central American and Caribbean Games
2018
Qualification tournaments for the 2019 Pan American Games